Neil Harper (born 21 February 1965) is a male retired British swimmer.

Early life
Harper attended Millfield School from 1979 to 1984, and was head boy.

Career
Harper competed at the 1984 Summer Olympics and the 1988 Summer Olympics. He represented England and won a silver medal in the 4 x 100 metres medley relay, at the 1986 Commonwealth Games in Edinburgh, Scotland, in addition to competing in the 100 metres backstroke event. He also won the 1986 ASA National Championship title in the 100 metres backstroke.

References

External links
 

1965 births
Living people
British male swimmers
Olympic swimmers of Great Britain
Swimmers at the 1984 Summer Olympics
Swimmers at the 1988 Summer Olympics
People from Pembury
Sportspeople from Kent
Commonwealth Games medallists in swimming
Commonwealth Games silver medallists for England
Swimmers at the 1986 Commonwealth Games
British male backstroke swimmers
People educated at Millfield
Medallists at the 1986 Commonwealth Games